Viktoriya Viktorivna Tihipko (née Lopatetska; born 17 August 1973) is a Ukrainian businesswoman and public figure.

Biography
Viktoriya was born on August 17, 1973. Her father, Viktor Lopatetskyi, was a military musician and a music teacher, and her mother, Lidiya, a speech therapist.

In 1996, Viktorivna Tihipko graduated from the faculty of International Economic Relations and Law from the Kyiv Institute of National Economy with honors.  She furthered her studies in Austria, at the Vienna University and the Vienna Economic University, where she studied financial management and international insurance.  Viktoriya also completed an Executive Education program at the University of California in Berkeley.

While still a freshman, Viktoriya worked as a broker at the Ukrainian universal trade stock, and as an English interpreter in a banking school at the International Management Institute.

She is founding partner and managing director of the venture capital firm TA Ventures, president of the  private investment club ICLUB Global, president of the Odesa International Film Festival, Chairman of the Supervisory Board of the Ukrainian Film Academy, planner of the "IDCEE. Internet technologies and Innovations" conference (2010–2014).

In 2018, Viktoriya Tihipko, together with Veroslava Novosilnaya, created Wtech - an international community for women leaders in tech and online business. Since 2021, she has been the Chairman of the Board of the Ukrainian Startup Fund.

Distinctions 

 2010: Ranked 23rd most successful business woman in Ukraine by Focus.ua
 2011: Ranked 13th most influential women in Ukraine by Focus.ua
 2012: Top 100 most influential Ukrainians
 2012: Ranked 5th most influential person on the Ukrainian web by Ain.ua

Personal life 
She married the Ukrainian politician and finance specialist Serhiy Tihipko in 2004.

References

External links 

1973 births
Living people
Businesspeople from Kyiv
Kyiv National Economic University alumni
21st-century Ukrainian businesspeople
Ukrainian women in business